Events from the year 1769 in Austria

Incumbents
 Monarch – Maria Theresa
 Monarch – Joseph II

Events

Births

Deaths

 
 
 
 
 December 30 – Nicholas Taaffe, 6th Viscount Taaffe, Austrian soldier (b. 1685)

References

 
Years of the 18th century in Austria